The 1880 Indiana gubernatorial election was held on October 12, 1880. Republican nominee Albert G. Porter defeated Democratic nominee Franklin Landers with 49.16% of the vote.

General election

Candidates
Major party candidates
Albert G. Porter, Republican, Comptroller of the Treasury under President Rutherford Hayes
Franklin Landers, Democratic, former U.S. Representative from Indiana's 7th congressional district

Other candidates
Robert Gregg, Greenback

Results

References

1880
Indiana
Gubernatorial